Laurent Desbiens (born 16 September 1969, Mons-en-Barœul) is a French former road cyclist, who competed professionally between 1992 and 2001. He won the 1993 Four Days of Dunkirk and won a stage in the 1997 Tour de France and wore the yellow jersey as leader of the general classification for two days in the 1998 Tour.

His name was on the list of doping tests published by the French Senate on 24 July 2013 that were collected during the 1998 Tour de France and found positive for EPO when retested in 2004.

Major results

1991
 2nd Overall Circuit Franco-Belge
1992
 1st Cholet-Pays de Loire
 6th Tour de Vendée
 7th Overall Tour d'Armorique
 8th Tour de Vendée
1993
 1st  Overall Four Days of Dunkirk
1st Stage 1
 3rd Paris–Bourges
 6th Overall Ronde van Nederland
 8th Overall Route du Sud
1994
 4th Overall Grand Prix du Midi Libre
1st Stage 3
 10th Coppa Bernocchi
1995
 6th Overall Tour du Limousin
 6th GP Ouest–France
 6th Grand Prix d'Isbergues
1996
 1st Tour de Vendée
 2nd Overall Tour de Luxembourg
 2nd Overall Tour de l'Oise
1st Stage 4
 3rd Trophée des Grimpeurs
 3rd Cholet-Pays de Loire
 6th Overall Four Days of Dunkirk
1997
 1st Stage 11 Tour de France
 1st Stage 1 Grand Prix du Midi Libre
 9th Trophée des Grimpeurs
 10th Tour de Vendée
1998
 1st A Travers le Morbihan
 Tour de France
Held  Stages 8–9
 2nd Trophée des Grimpeurs
 2nd Tour de Vendée
 5th Gent–Wevelgem
1999
 1st Stage 4 Critérium du Dauphiné Libéré
 1st Stage 4 Tour du Limousin
 2nd Châteauroux Classic
 2nd A Travers le Morbihan
2000
 9th Gran Premio Bruno Beghelli
2001
 1st  Mountains classification, Tour de Romandie

Grand Tour general classification results timeline

References

External links

1969 births
Living people
French male cyclists
French Tour de France stage winners
Sportspeople from Nord (French department)
Cyclists from Hauts-de-France